Sun Siyin (born June 6, 1984) is a Chinese former competitive figure skater. She is a four-time (2000–03) Chinese national silver medalist. Her highest placement at an ISU Championship was 11th at the 2003 Four Continents.

Programs

Competitive highlights 
GP: Grand Prix

References

External links
 

Chinese female single skaters
1984 births
Living people
Figure skaters from Harbin
Figure skaters at the 2003 Asian Winter Games